Isaac Clements (March 31, 1837 – May 31, 1909) was a U.S. Representative from Illinois.

Born near Brookville, Indiana, Clements attended the common schools. He was graduated from the Indiana Asbury College (now De Pauw University), Greencastle, Indiana, in 1859. He studied law in Greencastle. He moved to Illinois and taught school. He entered the Union Army in July 1861 and served as second lieutenant of Company G, Ninth Regiment, Illinois Volunteer Infantry. He remained in the service over three years. He was twice promoted. He was appointed register in bankruptcy in June 1867.

Clements was elected as a Republican to the Forty-third Congress (March 4, 1873 – March 3, 1875). He was an unsuccessful candidate for reelection in 1874 to the Forty-fourth Congress. He was appointed a United States penitentiary commissioner in 1877. He was a United States pension agent in Chicago, Illinois, from March 18, 1890, until November 4, 1893. He moved to Normal, Illinois, in 1899. He was the Superintendent of the Soldiers' Orphans' Home in Normal, Illinois. He subsequently received appointment as governor of the National Home for Disabled Veteran Soldiers in Danville, Illinois. He died in Danville on May 31, 1909. He was interred in Home Cemetery.

References

1837 births
1909 deaths
DePauw University alumni
Union Army officers
People from Franklin County, Indiana
Republican Party members of the United States House of Representatives from Illinois
19th-century American politicians